Eriphioides surinamensis is a moth of the subfamily Arctiinae. It was described by Heinrich Benno Möschler in 1877. It is found in Panama, Colombia and Ecuador.

References

Arctiinae
Moths described in 1877